The International Conference on Service Oriented Computing, short ICSOC, is an annual conference providing an outstanding forum for academics, industry researchers, developers, and practitioners to report and share groundbreaking work in service-oriented computing.
ICSOC has an 'A' rating from the Excellence in Research in Australia (ERA). Calls for Papers are regularly published on WikiCFP and on the conference website. The conference is also listed in Elsevier's Global Events List.

ICSOC applies high standards on its annual Committee Selection Process and requires all committee members and conference participants to follow its Code of Ethics and Professional Conduct.
 
ICSOC fosters cross-community scientific excellence by gathering experts from various disciplines, such as business process management, distributed systems, computer networks, wireless and mobile computing, cloud computing, networking, scientific workflows, services science, management science, and software engineering. Since 2007 ICSOC operates under the auspices of the Scientific Academy for Service Technology e.V. (ServTech), a non-profit association located in Potsdam, Germany. Traditionally the ICSOC venue changes from year to year between Europe, the Americas, and Asia/Pacific Rim. Except for 2004, all conference proceedings were published by Springer as Lecture Notes in Computer Science.

Up to ICSOC 2015, the proceedings listed below are openly accessible. For later issues, the date in parentheses specifies when open access will become effective.

Locations and organizers

Steering committee members 
 Boualem Benatallah (since 2008)
 Athman Bouguettaya (since 2020)
 Fabio Casati (2003-2022)
 Paco Curbera (2003-2013)
 Asit Dan (2007-2013)
 Bernd Krämer (since 2007)
 Winfried Lamersdorf (since 2012)
 Heiko Ludwig (2013-2022)
 Mike Papazoglou (since 2003, chair)
 Paolo Traverso (2003-2013)
 Jian Yang (since 2013)
 Liang Zhang (since 2013)

Proceedings
https://link.springer.com/book/10.1007/978-3-031-20984-0
Service-Oriented Computing - 20th International Conference, 
ICSOC 2022, 
Javier Troya, Brahim Medjahed, Mario Piattini, Lina Yao, Pablo Fernández, Antonio Ruiz-Cortés (eds)
Seville, Spain, November 29 – December 2, 2022.
Lecture Notes in Computer Science 13740, Springer Berlin Heidelberg,
, Volume 13740

https://link.springer.com/book/10.1007/978-3-030-91431-8
Service-Oriented Computing - 19th International Conference, 
ICSOC 2021, 
Hacid, H., Kao, O., Mecella, M., Moha, N., Paik, H. (eds)
Dubai, United Arab Emirates, November 22–25, 2021.
Lecture Notes in Computer Science 13121, Springer Berlin Heidelberg,
, Volume 13121

https://link.springer.com/book/10.1007/978-3-030-65310-1
Service-Oriented Computing - 18th International Conference, 
ICSOC 2020, 
Kafeza, E., Benatallah, B., Martinelli, F., Hacid, H., Bouguettaya, A., Motahari, H. (eds)
Dubai, United Arab Emirates, December 14–17, 2020.
Lecture Notes in Computer Science 12571, Springer Berlin Heidelberg,
, Volume 12571

https://link.springer.com/book/10.1007/978-3-030-33702-5
Service-Oriented Computing - 17th International Conference, 
ICSOC 2019, 
Yangui, S., Bouassida Rodriguez, I., Drira, K., Tari, Z. (eds)
Toulouse, France, October 28–31, 2019.
Lecture Notes in Computer Science 11895, Springer Berlin Heidelberg,
, Volume 11895

https://link.springer.com/book/10.1007%2F978-3-030-03596-9 (07.11.2023)
Service-Oriented Computing - 16th International Conference, 
ICSOC 2018,
Pahl, C., Vukovic, M., Yin, J., Yu, Q. (Eds.),
Hangzhou, China, November 12–15, 2018.
Lecture Notes in Computer Science 11236, Springer Berlin Heidelberg,
, Volume 11236

https://link.springer.com/book/10.1007%2F978-3-319-69035-3 (19.10.2022)
Service-Oriented Computing - 15th International Conference, 
ICSOC 2017,
Maximilien, M., Vallecillo, A., Wang, J., Oriol, M. (Eds.),
Malaga, Spain, November 13–16, 2017.
Lecture Notes in Computer Science 10601, Springer Berlin Heidelberg,
, Volume 10601

https://link.springer.com/book/10.1007%2F978-3-319-46295-0 (20.09.2021)
Service-Oriented Computing - 14th International Conference, 
ICSOC 2016,
Sheng, Q.Z., Stroulia, E., Tata, S., Bhiri, S. (Eds.),
Banff, Canada, October 16–19, 2016. 
Lecture Notes in Computer Science 9936, Springer Berlin Heidelberg, 
, Volume 9936

https://link.springer.com/book/10.1007%2F978-3-662-48616-0 
Service-Oriented Computing - 13th International Conference, 
ICSOC 2015,
Barros, A., Grigori, D., Narendra, N.C., Dam, H.K. (Eds.),
Goa, India, November 16–19, 2015.
Lecture Notes in Computer Science 9435, Springer Berlin Heidelberg, 
, Volume 9435

https://link.springer.com/book/10.1007%2F978-3-662-45391-9 
Service-Oriented Computing - 12th International Conference], 
ICSOC 2014, 
Franch, X., Ghose, A.K., Lewis, G.A., Bhiri, S. (Eds.), 
Paris, France, November 3–6, 2014. 
Lecture Notes in Computer Science, Springer Berlin / Heidelberg, 
, Volume 8831

https://link.springer.com/book/10.1007%2F978-3-642-45005-1
Service-Oriented Computing - 11th International Conference, 
ICSOC 2013,
Basu, S., Pautasso, C., Zhang, L., Fu, X. (Eds.),
Lecture Notes in Computer Science, Springer Berlin / Heidelberg, 
, Vol. 8274

https://link.springer.com/book/10.1007%2F978-3-642-34321-6
Service-Oriented Computing - 10th International Conference, 
ICSOC 2012,
Liu, C., Ludwig, H., Toumani, F., Yu, Q. (Eds.),
Lecture Notes in Computer Science, Springer Berlin / Heidelberg, 
, Vol. 7636

https://link.springer.com/book/10.1007%2F978-3-642-25535-9
Service-Oriented Computing - 9th International Conference, 
ICSOC 2011,
Kappel, G., Maamar, Z., Motahari-Nezhad, H.R. (Eds.),
Lecture Notes in Computer Science, Springer Berlin / Heidelberg, 
, Vol. 7084

https://link.springer.com/book/10.1007%2F978-3-642-17358-5
Service-Oriented Computing - 8th International Conference, 
ICSOC 2010,
Maglio, P.P., Weske, M., Yang, J., Fantinato, M. (Eds.),
Lecture Notes in Computer Science, Springer Berlin / Heidelberg, 
, Vol. 6470

https://link.springer.com/book/10.1007%2F978-3-642-10383-4
Service-Oriented Computing - 7th International Joint Conference, 
ICSOC-ServiceWave 2009,
Baresi, L., Chi, C.-H., Suzuki, J. (Eds.),
Lecture Notes in Computer Science, Springer Berlin / Heidelberg, 
, Vol. 5900

https://link.springer.com/book/10.1007%2F978-3-540-89652-4
Service-Oriented Computing - 6th International Conference, 
ICSOC 2008,
Bouguettaya, A., Krueger, I., Margaria, T. (Eds.),
Lecture Notes in Computer Science, Springer Berlin / Heidelberg, 
, Vol. 5364

https://link.springer.com/book/10.1007%2F978-3-540-74974-5
Service-Oriented Computing - Fifth International Conference,
ICSOC 2007,
Krämer, B.J., Lin, K.-J., Narasimhan, P. (Eds.), 
Lecture Notes in Computer Science, Springer Berlin / Heidelberg,
, Vol. 4749

https://link.springer.com/book/10.1007%2F11948148
Service-Oriented Computing - 4th International Conference,
ICSOC 2006,
Dan, A., Lamersdorf, W. (Eds.),
Lecture Notes in Computer Science, Springer Berlin / Heidelberg,
, Vol. 4294

https://link.springer.com/book/10.1007%2F11596141
Service-Oriented Computing - Third International Conference,
ICSOC 2005, 
Benatallah, B., Casati, F., Traverso, P. (Eds.),
Lecture Notes in Computer Science, Springer Berlin / Heidelberg,
, Vol. 3826

http://dl.acm.org/citation.cfm?id=1035167&CFID=651049220&CFTOKEN=47826368
2nd International Conference on Service Oriented Computing, 
ICSOC '04,
Aiello, M.,  Aoyama, M., Curbera, F., Papazoglou, M.P. (Eds.),
ACM New York, NY, USA,
, Order Number 104045

https://link.springer.com/book/10.1007%2Fb94513
Service-Oriented Computing - First International Conference,
ICSOC 2003, 
Orlowska, M.E., Weerawarana, S., Papazoglou, M.P., Yang, J. (Eds.),
Lecture Notes in Computer Science, Springer Berlin / Heidelberg,
, Vol. 2910

References

External links

See also 
 List of computer science conferences
 List of computer science conference acronyms

Computer science conferences